Serafin Romero Cuevas (June 25, 1928 – February 9, 2014) was a Filipino lawyer and an Associate Justice of the Supreme Court of the Philippines appointed during the government of Ferdinand Marcos.

Early life and education
Cuevas was born on June 25, 1928 in Bacoor, Cavite.
He went to Las Piñas Elementary School for his elementary education and to the University of Manila for his secondary education. He obtained his Bachelor of Laws degree from the University of the Philippines in 1952 and passed the bar examination the same year.

Career
Cuevas started his career as a professorial lecturer at the College of Law of the University of the Philippines and at the Institute of Law of the Far Eastern University. Afterwards, he became an Assistant Fiscal of the City of Manila and then a Judge to the Court of First Instance.

Before his appointment as an associate justice to the Supreme Court of the Philippines on May 31, 1984, he was an associate justice of the Intermediate Appellate Court.

In 2012, Justice Cuevas was the lead counsel of the defense panel against the impeachment of former Supreme Court Chief Justice Renato Corona.

Death
Justice Cuevas died on February 9, 2014. He was 85 years old.

References

1928 births
2014 deaths
Associate Justices of the Supreme Court of the Philippines
Secretaries of Justice of the Philippines
Deaths from cancer in the Philippines
Deaths from liver cancer
20th-century Filipino judges
Members of Iglesia ni Cristo
People from Bacoor
Estrada administration cabinet members
University of the Philippines alumni
Academic staff of the University of the Philippines
21st-century Filipino judges